Patrick Smyth may refer to:

 Patrick James Smyth (c. 1823 – 1885), Irish politician and journalist
 Patrick Smyth (runner) (born 1986), American long distance runner
 Patrick Smyth (teacher) (1893–1954), New Zealand educator

See also
 Patrick Smith (disambiguation)
 Patrick Smythe (disambiguation)